Enterprise value/sales is a financial ratio that compares the total value (as measured by enterprise value) of the company to its sales. The ratio is, strictly speaking, denominated in years; it demonstrates how many dollars of EV are generated by one dollar of yearly sales. Generally, the lower the ratio, the cheaper the company is. Some investment professionals believe—as enterprise value and sales both consider debt and equity holders—EV/Sales is superior to the oft quoted price/sales ratio.

References

External links
 
 

Financial ratios